Mary Ross or Rosse may refer to:

Mary Ross (shipbuilder), English shipbuilder
Mary G. Ross (1908–2008), Native American female engineer
Mary Jane Ross, Cherokee writer
Mary Leslie, Countess of Ross
Mary C. Ross, first African-American woman to be elected to the Rhode Island House of Representatives; see List of first African-American U.S. state legislators
Mary Rosse (1813–1885), astronomer and photographer
Mary Ross, character in The Toys of Caliban
Mary Ross, character in The Airmail Mystery